Xpu Há is a bay, village, and resort area in Solidaridad municipality of Quintana Roo state, on the Mayan Riviera in southeastern Mexico.

It is in the municipality of Solidaridad, Quintana Roo, Mexico.

Xpu Há has an assortment of hotels, cabins, restaurants, and dive shops for tourists. At the north of Xpu Há Bay is the Cenote Manati, one of the largest natural water cenotes in the region.

According to INEGI, the village has only two full-time inhabitants and one year-round occupied dwelling.

References

Populated places in Quintana Roo
Populated coastal places in Mexico
Solidaridad (municipality)
Seaside resorts in Mexico
Tourist attractions in Quintana Roo